Savage Love may refer to:

Savage Love, a sex-advice column written by American author Dan Savage.
Savage Love (book), a 1998 non-fiction book written by Dan Savage.
"Savage Love (Laxed – Siren Beat)", a 2020 song by Jawsh 685 and Jason Derulo.
"Savage Lover", a 1979 song by The Ring.
Savage/Love, a 2011 play by Sam Shepard and Joseph Chaikin.